Va'aiga Paotama Tukuitonga is a Niuean politician and former Cabinet Minister.  She is member of the Niue Assembly for the village of Alofi North.

Tukuitonga was educated at Victoria University of Wellington. She has previously worked as a Justice of Peace, public servant, and schoolteacher. She was first elected to the Assembly in the 1999 elections, defeating sitting Premier Frank Lui in his own seat.  She was re-elected at the 2002 and 2005 elections, and appointed to the Cabinet of Young Vivian as Minister of Education after the latter.  She was elected unopposed at the 2008 election.

In 2013 Tukuitonga blamed Niue's falling population on the use of contraception.

References

Year of birth missing (living people)
Living people
Members of the Niue Assembly
Government ministers of Niue
Victoria University of Wellington alumni
Women government ministers of Niue
20th-century New Zealand women politicians
20th-century New Zealand politicians
21st-century New Zealand women politicians
21st-century New Zealand politicians